Amos Clark Jr. (November 8, 1828 – October 31, 1912) was an American Republican Party politician and businessman who represented New Jersey's 3rd congressional district for one term from 1873 to 1875.

Early life and career
Born in Brooklyn, New York, Clark engaged in business in New York City while living in Elizabeth, New Jersey, where he was also largely interested in real estate.

Political career
He was a member of the Elizabeth City Council in 1865 and 1866, served in the New Jersey Senate from 1866 to 1869 and was elected as a Republican to the United States House of Representatives in 1872, serving from 1873 to 1875, being unsuccessful for reelection in 1874.

Afterwards, Clark retired to his residence in Norfolk County, Massachusetts, but retained business interests back in Elizabeth. He died in Boston, Massachusetts, on October 31, 1912, and was interred in Evergreen Cemetery in Hillside, New Jersey.

References

External links

Amos Clark Jr. at The Political Graveyard

1828 births
1912 deaths
Republican Party New Jersey state senators
People from Brooklyn
People from Norfolk County, Massachusetts
Politicians from Elizabeth, New Jersey
Republican Party members of the United States House of Representatives from New Jersey
Burials at Evergreen Cemetery (Hillside, New Jersey)
19th-century American politicians
Businesspeople from Elizabeth, New Jersey
19th-century American businesspeople